William Francis Smith (February 24, 1903 – February 26, 1968) was a United States circuit judge of the United States Court of Appeals for the Third Circuit and previously was a United States district judge of the United States District Court for the District of New Jersey.

Education and career

Born in Perth Amboy, New Jersey, the son of John Stephan Smith and Ann Elizabeth Owens, Smith received a Graduate of Pharmacy degree from Columbia University in 1922. He received a Bachelor of Laws from New Jersey Law School (now Rutgers Law School) in 1929. He became deputy mayor of Perth Amboy in 1926. He was in private practice of law in New Jersey from 1930 to 1931. He was an Instructor at New Jersey Law School from 1930 to 1935. He was an Assistant United States Attorney of the District of New Jersey from 1934 to 1940. He was the United States Attorney for the District of New Jersey from 1940 to 1941.

Federal judicial service

Smith was nominated by President Franklin D. Roosevelt on January 23, 1941, to the United States District Court for the District of New Jersey, to a new seat created by 54 Stat. 219. He was confirmed by the United States Senate on February 13, 1941, and received his commission on February 15, 1941. He served as Chief Judge from 1959 to 1961. His service was terminated on September 12, 1961, due to elevation to the Third Circuit.

Smith was nominated by President John F. Kennedy on August 15, 1961, to a seat on the United States Court of Appeals for the Third Circuit vacated by Judge Phillip Forman. He was confirmed by the Senate on August 30, 1961, and received his commission the same day. His service was terminated on February 26, 1968, due to his death at Saint Peter's University Hospital in New Brunswick, New Jersey.

Federal court service

Smith was believed to have been the youngest federal court judge at the time of his appointment. In 1959 he was called upon by Chief Justice Earl Warren to clear up a logjam that had developed at the Brooklyn Federal Court of the Eastern District of New York, and he brought the court's docket up to date in six months.

Personal

On August 29, 1935, he married Marie Cathers.

References

External links

Biographical information for William Francis Smith from The Political Graveyard

1903 births
1968 deaths
People from Perth Amboy, New Jersey
People from New Brunswick, New Jersey
Columbia University College of Pharmacy alumni
Rutgers School of Law–Newark alumni
New Jersey lawyers
American legal scholars
United States Attorneys for the District of New Jersey
Judges of the United States District Court for the District of New Jersey
United States district court judges appointed by Franklin D. Roosevelt
20th-century American judges
Judges of the United States Court of Appeals for the Third Circuit
United States court of appeals judges appointed by John F. Kennedy
Assistant United States Attorneys